The Mwea National Reserve is a nature reserve in Kenya. The other vegetation is mixed among the scattered large trees (Acacia species and baobab trees), typical savannah ecosystem. Open grasslands are dominant along the main rivers, with occasional thick undergrowth, as well as a riparian or riverine woodland.

Wildlife 
Game species range from African elephants, lesser kudus, Nile crocodiles, giraffes, Grant's zebras, buffalos, African leopards, common duikers, black-backed jackals, bushbucks, waterbucks, Sykes' monkeys, warthogs, rock hyraxes, bush pigs, impalas and hartebeests. Striped ground squirrels, Common Genet Cat and yellow baboons are also found in Mwea.

Bird watching 
Renowned for its water birds and waders, over 200 species of birds have been recorded in the reserve. This warranted it being an Important Bird Area (IBA). The reserve is the only protected area in which the globally threatened and Kenya-endemic Hinde's babbler (Turdoides hindei) is known to occur. Mwea National Reserve also shelters two other rare species; the Pel's fishing owl (Scotopelia peli) and the white-backed night heron (Gorsachius leuconotus). The Malagasy pond heron (Ardeola idae) is also a common sighting.

Camps 
The reserve has seven campsites: Mbogo, Silvester, Mavuria, Kyangosi, Hippo-Point, Kanyonga and Githechu.

Other attractions 
These include game viewing, boat rides at Kamburu Dam, hippo sighting at Hippo Point, bird watching and walking (walking circuit).

References

External links

 kws.org
 magicalkenya.com

Wildlife sanctuaries of Kenya
Embu County
Important Bird Areas of Kenya
Protected areas of Kenya
Protected areas established in 1976
1976 establishments in Kenya